Celastrina dipora, the dusky blue cupid, is a small butterfly found in India that belongs to the lycaenids or blues family.

References
 
 

 

Celastrina
Butterflies of Asia
Butterflies described in 1865